Fred J. Rode (May 19, 1896 – October 1971) was an American set decorator. He was nominated for an Academy Award in the category Best Art Direction for the film Fourteen Hours.

Selected filmography
 Fourteen Hours (1951)

References

External links

American set decorators
1896 births
1971 deaths
People from Brooklyn